The 2017 South Carolina Gamecocks baseball team represented the University of South Carolina in the 2017 NCAA Division I baseball season.  The Gamecocks played their home games at Founders Park. The team was led by 5th year head coach Chad Holbrook.

Record vs. conference opponents

References

South Carolina
South Carolina Gamecocks baseball seasons
South Carolina Gamecocks baseball